Ngarra (1920–2008) was an Aboriginal Australian artist of the Andinyin and Gija peoples, known for his paintings on canvas and paper which depicted his homelands in the Kimberley region of Western Australia, along with events from the ancestral and colonial past. Among Aboriginal people in the central and east Kimberley he was revered for his deep knowledge of Aboriginal ceremonial practices which he learned from his grandparents Muelbyne and Larlgarlbyne while living nomadically in the remote Mornington Range.

Early life 
Ngarra was born in 1920 on Glenroy Station in the west Kimberley. An orphan, he ran away from the station and went to live with his grandparents Muebyne and Larlgarbyne.

Career 
Ngarra started painting in 1994. His work was facilitated and documented by the anthropologist Kevin Shaw.

Ngarra's late paintings are defined by his use of vibrant colour contrast, which he achieved by mixing Ara acrylic paints to create his own palette. Ngarra’s paintings contain many references to pre-colonial Aboriginal traditions. His works were exhibited at the Western Australian Museum in 2000, and some are held in the National Gallery of Victoria, the Art Gallery of Western Australia and Museum Victoria.

In 2015, sixteen of Ngarra's works were included in the exhibition No Boundaries: Aboriginal Australian Contemporary Abstract Painting. Organised by William Fox and Henry Skerritt for the Nevada Museum of Art, the exhibition toured to five museums across the United States. A tribute to the artist was included in the inaugural Tarnanthi exhibition in 2015 at the Art Gallery of South Australia.

Collections 
 Artbank
 Art Gallery of Western Australia
 Berndt Museum of Anthropology, University of Western Australia
 Edith Cowan University
 Museum Victoria
 Redland City Art Gallery
 Western Australian Museum

References

Further reading 
 Coslovich, Gabriella Ngarra finds his art through the hands of time. The Age, Oct 05, 2002.
 
 Late bloomer's broad palette. 2008. The Canberra Times, 11 December  2008.

 Sprague, Quentin. "Outside history-Mick Jawalji and Ngarra." Art Monthly Australia 244 (2011): 80.
 Skerritt, Henry F. "Ngarra, Andinyin/Kitja, Artist, c. 1920-2008." Art Monthly Australia 216 (2008): 42.
 Skerritt, Henry F. Culture mirrored in art. The Courier-Mail, Dec 30, 2008.
 Skerritt, Henry F. A master of tradition and innovation. Sydney Morning Herald, Dec 06, 2008.

20th-century Australian painters
21st-century Australian painters
Artists from Western Australia
Australian Aboriginal artists
2008 deaths
Year of birth uncertain